Jure Šinkovec (born 3 July 1985) is a Slovenian ski jumper who has competed since 2005.

Šinkovec's first podium in World Cup was in a team competition in Harrachov HS 142m in December 2011. His best result in World Cup is 1st place in Oberstdorf 2012 ski flying competition on team event, together with Jurij Tepeš, Peter Prevc, and Robert Kranjec. That was the first win for Slovenian ski jumping on World Cup team events.

References

1985 births
Living people
Slovenian male ski jumpers
Skiers from Ljubljana
21st-century Slovenian people